Kasanje  may refer to:
 Kasanje Kingdom, a pre-colonial kingdom in present-day Angola
 Kasanje, Uganda, a location in Uganda